Lozen Nunatak is a 440m hill in upper Huron Glacier, Livingston Island.  It is part of a minor ridge in the north foothills of Tangra Mountains including also Erma Knoll and Aheloy Nunatak, and linked to Zograf Peak by Lozen Saddle.  The hill was first visited on 17 December 2004 by the Bulgarian Lyubomir Ivanov from Camp Academia.  It is named after the Lozen Monastery of St. Spas (Holy Saviour) in western Bulgaria.

Location

Maps
 L.L. Ivanov et al. Antarctica: Livingston Island and Greenwich Island, South Shetland Islands. Scale 1:100000 topographic map. Sofia: Antarctic Place-names Commission of Bulgaria, 2005.
 L.L. Ivanov. Antarctica: Livingston Island and Greenwich, Robert, Snow and Smith Islands. Scale 1:120000 topographic map.  Troyan: Manfred Wörner Foundation, 2009.

References
Lozen Nunatak. SCAR Composite Antarctic Gazetteer
 Bulgarian Antarctic Gazetteer. Antarctic Place-names Commission. (details in Bulgarian, basic data in English)

External links
 Lozen Nunatak. Copernix satellite image

Nunataks of Livingston Island